John William Draper (May 5, 1811 – January 4, 1882) was an English-born American scientist, philosopher, physician, chemist, historian and photographer. He is credited with producing the first clear photograph of a female face (1839–40) and the first detailed photograph of the moon in 1840. He was also the first president of the American Chemical Society (1876–77) and a founder of the New York University School of Medicine.

One of Draper's books, the History of the Conflict between Religion and Science, popularised the conflict thesis proposing intrinsic hostility in the relationship between religion and science. It was widely read and was translated into several languages. His son, Henry Draper, and his granddaughter, Antonia Maury, were astronomers; his granddaughter, Carlotta Maury (Antonia's younger sister), was a paleontologist; his eldest son, John Christopher Draper, was a chemist; and son , was a meteorologist.

Early life
John William Draper was born May 5, 1811, in St. Helens, Lancashire, England, to John Christopher Draper, a Wesleyan clergyman and Sarah (Ripley) Draper. He also had three sisters, Dorothy Catherine (August 6, 1807 – December 10, 1901), Elizabeth Johnson, and Sarah Ripley. On June 23, he was baptized by the Wesleyan Methodist minister Jabez Bunting. His father often needed to move the family due to serving various congregations throughout England. John Wm. Draper was home tutored until 1822, when he entered Woodhouse Grove School. He returned to home instruction (1826) prior to entering University College London in 1829. While at University College London, Draper studied chemistry under the direction of Edward Turner (chemist).

On September 13, 1831, John William Draper married Antonia Caetana de Paiva Pereira Gardner (c. 1814–1870), the daughter of Daniel Gardner, a court physician to John VI of Portugal and Charlotte of Spain. Antonia was born in Brazil after the royal family fled Portugal with Napoleon's invasion. There is dispute as to the identity of Antonia's mother. Around 1830, Antonia was sent with her brother Daniel to live with their aunt in London.

Following his father's death in July 1831, John William's mother was urged to move with her children to the US state of Virginia. John William hoped to acquire a teaching position at a local Methodist college.

Virginia

Although he arrived too late to obtain the prospective teaching position, John William established a laboratory in Christiansville. Here he conducted experiments and published eight papers before entering medical school. His sister Dorothy Catherine Draper provided finances through teaching drawing and painting for his medical education. In March 1836, he graduated from the University of Pennsylvania School of Medicine. That same year, he began teaching at Hampden–Sydney College in Virginia.

New York

In 1837, Draper accepted an appointment to be head of chemistry in a proposed medical school at New York University, but sufficient funds were not available to go ahead with the project. In 1839, Draper was elected undergraduate professor of chemistry and botany at the university, and moved with his family to New York City . Once there he helped to found the New York University Medical School, acting as a professor there from 1840 to 1850, president of the school from 1850 to 1873, and as a professor of chemistry until 1881.

Work
Draper did important research in photochemistry, made portrait photography possible by his improvements (1839) on Louis Daguerre's process, and published a textbook on Chemistry (1846), textbook on Natural Philosophy (1847), textbook on Physiology (1866), and Scientific Memoirs (1878) on radiant energy.

In 1839–1840, Draper produced clear photographs which at that time were regarded as the first life photographs of a human face. Draper took a series of pictures, with a 65-second exposure in sunlight. The first ones, of a female assistant whose face was covered with a thin layer of flour to increase contrast, were not preserved. Draper also photographed his sister, Dorothy Catherine Draper, and one of those pictures (see image) became known to the public via the letter which Draper sent to John Herschel in 1840. Several copies were made of this picture in the 19th century, and the photograph attached with Draper's letter was also likely a copy made by Draper himself.

In March 1840 Draper became the second person to produce photographs of an astronomical object, the Moon, considered the first astrophotographs. In 1843 he made daguerreotypes of the solar spectrum that revealed new infra-red and ultra violet lines. In 1850 he was making photomicrographs and engaged his son, Henry (then 13 years old), into their production.

Draper developed the proposition in 1842 that only light rays that are absorbed can produce chemical change.  It came to be known as the Grotthuss–Draper law when his name was teamed with a prior but apparently unknown promulgator Theodor Grotthuss of the same idea in 1817.

In 1847 he published the observation that all solids glow red at about the same temperature, about 977 °F (798 K), which has come to be known as the Draper point.

On Saturday 30 May the 1860 Oxford evolution debate featured Draper's lecture on his paper "On the Intellectual Development of Europe, considered with reference to the views of Mr. Darwin and others, that the progression of organisms is determined by law."  Draper's presentation was an early example of applying a Darwinian metaphor of adaptation and environment to social and political studies, but was thought to be long and boring. The hall was crowded to hear Bishop Samuel Wilberforce's views on Charles Darwin's recent publication of On the Origin of Species, and the occasion was a historically significant part of the reaction to Darwin's theory due to reports of Thomas Henry Huxley's response to Wilberforce.

Contributions to the discipline of history: Draper is well known also as the author of The History of the Intellectual Development of Europe (1862), applying the methods of physical science to history, a History of the American Civil War (3 vols., 1867–1870), and a History of the Conflict between Religion and Science (1874). The last book listed is among the most influential works on the conflict thesis, which takes its name from Draper's title. His book examined the relationship between religion and science, dismissing ideas of harmony and presenting the history of science as "not a mere record of isolated discoveries; it is a narrative of the conflict of two contending powers, the expansive force of the human intellect on the one side, and the compression arising from traditional faith and human interests on the other." After outlining the origins of science in ancient Greek philosophy, Draper presented the development of Christianity as leading to repression of science. His argument, aimed at his fellow Protestants, employed anti-Catholic rhetoric, but also said that these "two rival divisions of the Christian church" were "in accord on one point: to tolerate no science except such as they considered agreeable to the Scriptures", and both were liable to "theological odium". The book went through fifty printings in the United States alone, and was translated into ten languages. Professor Ronald Numbers has pointed to Draper's book as a source of popular misconceptions about historical conflict between science and religion, saying that it was "less of a dispassionate history, which it wasn't, than a screed against Roman Catholics" motivated by personal animus at the behavior of his sister, a Catholic nun, regarding the death of his son.

Draper was elected as a member of the American Philosophical Society in 1844. He served as the first president of the American Chemical Society in 1876.
He was elected to the National Academy of Sciences in 1877.

Children
 John Christopher Draper (1835–1885)
 Henry Draper (1837–1882)
 Virginia Draper Maury (1839–1885)
  (1841–1931)
 William Draper (1845–1853)
 Antonia Draper Dixon (1849–1923)

Death

He died on January 4, 1882, at his home in Hastings-on-Hudson, New York, at the age of 70.  The funeral was held at St Mark's Church in-the-Bowery in New York City. He was buried in Green-Wood Cemetery, Brooklyn, New York.

Legacy 
In 1975, Draper's house, known as the Henry Draper Observatory, in Hastings was designated a National Historic Landmark.

In 1976, New York University founded the John W. Draper Interdisciplinary Master's Program in Humanities and Social Thought (Draper Program) in honor of his lifelong commitment to interdisciplinary study.

In 2001, Draper and the founding of the American Chemical Society were designated a National Historic Chemical Landmark at New York University.

Publications
Draper wrote a number of books and articles for magazines and journals (Google Scholar). His books include: 
 Elements of Chemistry, Including the Most Recent Discoveries and Applications of the Science to Medicine and Pharmacy, and to the Arts. by Robert Kane and John William Draper. New York: Harper and Brothers, 1842.
  History of the American Civil War. New York: Harper & Brothers, 1867–70.
 History of the Conflict Between Religion and Science. New York: D. Appleton, 1874.
 History of the Intellectual Development of Europe. New York: Harper & Brothers, 1863, 1900 edition, v.1,v.2
 Human Physiology, Statistical and Dynamical; or, the Conditions and Course of the Life of Man. New York: Harper & Brothers, 1856.
 Life of Franklin, Edited by Ronald S. Wilkinson. Washington, D.C.: Library of Congress: U.S. Government Printing Office, 1977.
 Draper, John William. (1875). History of the Conflict between Religion and Science. Henry S. King & Co (reissued by Cambridge University Press, 2009)
 Science in America: Inaugural address of Dr. John W. Draper, as president of the American Chemical Society New York: J.F. Trow & Son, Printers, 1876.
 Scientific Memoirs; Being Experimental Contributions to a Knowledge of Radiant Energy. New York: Harper & Brothers, 1878.
 Text-Book on Chemistry. For the Use of Schools and Colleges. New York: Harper & Brothers, 1851, 1861 edition
  Text-Book on Natural Philosophy. New York: Harper & Brothers, 1847.
 Thoughts on the Future Civil Policy of America. 3rd ed. New York: Harper & Brothers, 1867.
 Treatise on the Forces Which Produce the Organization of Plants. With an Appendix Containing Several Memoirs on Capillary Attraction, Electricity, and the Chemical Action of Light. New York: Harper & Brothers, 1844.

References

Sources
 Barker, George Frederick. Memoir of John William Draper: 1811–1882. Washington, D.C., 1886.
 Fleming, Donald. John William Draper and the Religion of Science. Philadelphia: University of Pennsylvania Press, 1950.
 Hentschel, Klaus. Why not one more Imponderable?: John William Draper and his `Tithonic rays', "Foundations of Chemistry" 4,1 (2002): 5-59.
 Miller, Lillian B., Frederick Voss, and Jeannette M. Hussey. The Lazzaroni: Science and Scientists in Mid-Nineteenth-Century America. Washington, D.C.: Smithsonian Institution Press, 1972.
 Ungureanu, James C. Science, Religion, and the Protestant Tradition: Retracing the Origins of Conflict. Pittsburgh: University of Pittsburgh Press, 2019.

External links

 McManus, Howard R. "The Most Famous Daguerreian Portrait: Exploring the History of the Dorothy Catherine Draper Daguerreotype," The Daguerreian Annual, 1995, 148–71.
 THE DAGUERREOTYPE PORTRAIT OF DOROTHY DRAPER. The Photographic Journal (Royal Photographic Society), December 1970, vol. 110, pp. 478–482
 John William Draper family papers, 1777-1951 at the Library of Congress
 Draper Family Collection, ca. 1826–1936 at the National Museum of American History
 Draper Family Collection, 1836–1982 at the New York University Archives
 
 
 Harper's Magazine articles by John William Draper
 John W. Draper and the Founding of the American Chemical Society, 1876 at National Historic Chemical Landmarks
 Dorothy Catherine Draper, taken by John W. Draper
 Moon - 1840 - The Metropolitan Museum of Art Collections
 NYU First Medical Faculty, 1841 J.W. Draper lower right corner
 New York University John W. Draper Interdisciplinary Master's Program in Humanities and Social Thought (Draper Program)
 Draper Chemical Society: The NYU Chemical Society
 National Academy of Sciences Biographical Memoir

Astrophotographers
Photochemists
1811 births
1882 deaths
American chemists
Historians of the American Civil War
Historians of science
Presidents of the American Chemical Society
Burials at Green-Wood Cemetery
People from St Helens, Merseyside
English emigrants to the United States
Alumni of University College London
Perelman School of Medicine at the University of Pennsylvania alumni
New York University faculty
Hampden–Sydney College faculty
People educated at Woodhouse Grove School
19th-century American historians
19th-century American male writers
19th-century American photographers
American religious skeptics
Secular humanists
People from Mecklenburg County, Virginia
Scientists from Virginia
American male non-fiction writers
Historians from Virginia